The Ethels are 95 hills in the Peak District of England, mostly over  above sea level but including various prominent lower hills. The Ethels are a tribute to Ethel Haythornthwaite who pioneered the establishment of the Peak District as Britain's first national park in 1951.

The Peak District and South Yorkshire branch of the CPRE countryside charity announced The Ethels in May 2021. The Ethels were devised in early 2021 by CPRE volunteer Doug Colton, who then built the Ethel Ready smartphone app for hill bagging.

Most of the Ethels lie within the Peak District National Park, but others lie outside its borders. The list is sorted by height above sea level. Marilyns are marked in boldface.

The Ethels featured on BBC North West TV broadcasts on 27 May 2021 and 7 Sep 2021. Clare Balding presented '95 Ethels in the Peak District' on the Ramblings programme on BBC Radio 4 on 10 Mar 2022.

See also 
 List of hills in the Peak District
 Lists of mountains and hills in the British Isles
 List of Wainwrights in the Lake District

References 

Lists of mountains and hills of England
Mountains and hills of the Peak District
Peak District